State Trunk Highway 112 (often called Highway 112, STH-112 or WIS 112) is a state highway in the U.S. state of Wisconsin. It runs in a north–south in northwest Wisconsin from Marengo to Ashland.

Route description

Starting at WIS 13 north of Marengo, WIS 112 starts to travel westward. After crossing the river, it then intersects WIS 118. Continuing north, it then encounters the John F. Kennedy Memorial Airport, then enters the city of Ashland, and then intersects WIS 137 before it intersects US 2/WIS 13. At that point, the route ends there.

Major intersections

See also

References

External links

112
Transportation in Ashland County, Wisconsin